Arragonia anatolica is a moth of the family Autostichidae. It is found in Turkey.

The wingspan is about 23 mm.

References

Moths described in 1986
Holcopogoninae
Insects of Turkey